Jacqueline Brisepierre (born 30 October 1945) is a French gymnast. She competed at the 1964 Summer Olympics and the 1968 Summer Olympics.

References

1945 births
Living people
French female artistic gymnasts
Olympic gymnasts of France
Gymnasts at the 1964 Summer Olympics
Gymnasts at the 1968 Summer Olympics
Place of birth missing (living people)
20th-century French women